Barbara Wheeler  (born in 1967 or 1968) was a Republican member of the Illinois House of Representatives, representing the 64th district from 2013 to 2019. The district contained parts of Lake County and McHenry County.

Early life
Wheeler was a Peace Corps volunteer. She received education degrees from Loyola University Chicago and National Louis University, and worked as a teacher at Wauconda Middle School. She moved to Crystal Lake in 1998.

Political career
Wheeler served on the McHenry County Board from 2002 to 2012. In 2012 she was elected to the Illinois House of Representatives in the newly redrawn 64th district. She faced no opposition in the primary or general elections.

Wheeler did not run for re-election in 2018.

References

External links
Representative  Barbara Wheeler (R) 64th District at the Illinois General Assembly
By Session: 98th, 99th, 100th
State Representative Barb Wheeler constituency site
Barb Wheeler for State Representative
 

1960s births
Living people
Women state legislators in Illinois
Republican Party members of the Illinois House of Representatives
Peace Corps volunteers
Year of birth missing (living people)
21st-century American politicians
County board members in Illinois
Loyola University Chicago alumni
National Louis University alumni
21st-century American women politicians